Northeast Italy ( or just ) is one of the five official statistical regions of Italy used by the National Institute of Statistics (ISTAT), a first level NUTS region and a European Parliament constituency. Northeast encompasses four of the country's 20 regions:

Emilia-Romagna
Friuli-Venezia Giulia
Trentino-Alto Adige/Südtirol
Veneto

Culturally and historically, Emilia-Romagna is part of Northwest Italy, but is included in Northeast Italy for statistical reasons.

Culture
Italian is the main language. Other languages include Venetian, widely spoken in Veneto and along the coast to Trieste and Istria, as well as in the towns of Pordenone and Gorizia in Friuli, and in most of Trentino, but only recognised by the Veneto region; Friulian, spoken in most of Friuli and nationally recognized, and Ladin, spoken by a few thousand people in the Dolomites. Other languages are German, the primary language of South Tyrol, where Italian is spoken by about two thirds of the inhabitants, and Slovene, recognized by Italy and spoken on the border of Italy and Istria, where the main language today is Croatian but Italian is recognized as a minority language.

The terms Tre Venezie or Triveneto (literally "Triple Veneto"), refer to the three regions of  Veneto (before 1947 Venezia Euganea, united to Friuli) Trentino-Alto Adige/Südtirol (once Venezia Tridentina) and Friuli-Venezia Giulia.

Venetia, a region which indicated the old land provinces of the Venetian Republic from river Adda to river Isonzo, and is sometimes still used today to indicate this territory together with Trentino and Trieste.

Venetia et Histria, an old region of Italy at the time of Roman Empire, refers to Veneto, Trentino, Friuli-Venezia Giulia, East Lombardy and Istria; it was named after the people of Veneti, who inhabited that region, and who are still largely the main ethnic group of the Italian area (other main ethnic groups include Friulani in the east, mostly in Udine province; Ladins in the Dolomites are between Veneto and Trentino-Alto Adige/Südtirol; Germans in South Tyrol; and Slovene minorities on the border with Slovenia and in the city of Trieste); while after 1947 Venetian/Italian people are just a minority in Slovenian and Croatian Istria.

Economy 
The Gross domestic product (GDP) of the region was 407.9 billion euros in 2018, accounting for 23.1% of Italy's economic output. GDP per capita adjusted for purchasing power was 34,900 euros or 116% of the EU27 average in the same year.

See also
 National Institute of Statistics (Italy)
 Italian NUTS level 1 regions:
 Northwest Italy
 Central Italy
 South Italy
 Insular Italy
 Northern Italy
 Southern Italy

References

External links
 Regione Veneto — Official homepage
 Regione Friuli Venezia Giulia — Official homepage
 Regione Trentino-Alto Adige — Official homepage 
 After Venice - Northeast Italy tourism portal
 Timetotravel.it - Tourism in Triveneto (italian north-east)

Geography of Italy
NUTS 1 statistical regions of the European Union